Captain Sir Charles Marsh Schomberg  (1779 – 2 January 1835) was an officer of the British Royal Navy, who served during French Revolutionary and Napoleonic Wars, and later served as Lieutenant-Governor of Dominica.

Biography

Family background
Schomberg was born in Dublin, the youngest son of the naval officer Captain Sir Alexander Schomberg and Arabella Susannah, the only child of the Reverend Henry Chalmers, and niece of Sir Edmund Aleyn. His older brother was Admiral Alexander Wilmot Schomberg.

Early naval career
Schomberg entered the navy in 1788 as captain's servant on the yacht of the Lord Lieutenant of Ireland, under his father's command. From 1793, at the outbreak of the French Revolutionary War, he served as midshipman aboard  and the 74-gun  under Captain Thomas Louis. In early 1797 Minotaur was sent to reinforce the fleet off Cádiz and was engaged in several boat actions with the Spanish flotilla and shore batteries. Minotaur remained part of the inshore squadron off Cádiz until 24 May 1798, when she sailed for the Mediterranean, in company with a squadron under the command of Captain Thomas Troubridge. They joined the squadron of Sir Horatio Nelson near Toulon, and subsequently defeated the French at the battle of the Nile in August 1798. During the battle Minotaur fought , and after her surrender she was taken possession of by Schomberg.

Between November 1798 and October 1799 Schomberg, now the first lieutenant of Minotaur, was employed on the coast of the Kingdom of Naples. In mid-1800 Minotaur served as the flagship of Lord Keith at the siege of Genoa.

Schomberg then served as Flag Lieutenant to Lord Keith, aboard , during the Egyptian Campaign. He was sent to Cairo to act as a liaison officer between Keith and the Kapudan Pasha, the commander of Turkish naval forces, during the Siege of Alexandria. Schomberg was appointed acting-commander of the sloop , though it is unclear if he ever took command of her as he was employed onshore until the surrender of the French in September 1801. Following the evacuation of Egypt Schomberg was sent on a mission to Tunis, for which Sir Alexander Ball, the Governor of Malta, later presented him with a handsome piece of plate, and for his services in Egypt he was awarded the Imperial Ottoman Order of the Crescent. On 29 April 1802 his promotion to commander was confirmed.

Post-captain
Schomberg was promoted to post-captain on 6 August 1803, and he took command of the 54-gun , stationed as guard ship at Malta. In February 1807 Schomberg took part in the failed Dardanelles Operation under John Duckworth, but on his return to Malta Madras was put out of commission, and he returned to England, after an absence of more than ten years.

Unfortunately poor weather and contrary winds meant he arrived off the Tagus after the British squadron, and so negotiations were already underway by Sir W. Sidney Smith, who he then joined aboard Foudroyant as flag captain as they transported the royal family to Brazil in November 1807. Schomberg was later made a Knight of the Portuguese Order of the Tower and Sword.

The Battle of Tamatave
One French frigate, Renommée, surrendered to Schomberg's ship; Néréide escaped, only to surrender at Tamatave in Madagascar a few days later; and  escaped for good. The Battle of Tamatave marked the last French attempt to operate in the Indian Ocean during the Napoleonic Wars. Nearly four decades later the battle was among the actions recognised by a clasp attached to the Naval General Service Medal, awarded upon application to all British participants still living in 1847. Schomberg was preparing his ship for service in North America, when the Admiralty ordered her to be put out of commission.

Later career
Schomberg was appointed a Companion of the Order of the Bath on 4 June 1815. On 21 September 1832 he was made a Knight Commander of the Royal Guelphic Order. On 7 February 1833 Schomberg was appointed Lieutenant Governor of Dominica. He died on 2 January 1835, while in that service, aboard , the flagship of Sir George Cockburn, while anchored in Carlisle Bay. He was interred in St Paul's Chapel on the same day.

References

Bibliography
 
 

1779 births
1835 deaths
Military personnel from Dublin (city)
British people of German-Jewish descent
Royal Navy officers
Royal Navy personnel of the Napoleonic Wars
Royal Navy personnel of the French Revolutionary Wars
Companions of the Order of the Bath
Knights of the Order of the Crescent
Governors of Dominica